Revival is a studio album by South African jazz trumpeter Hugh Masekela. The album was released on  via Heads Up International label.

Reception
Brian Soergel of Jazz Times mentioned: "Revival continues the paradigm established long ago: Take a couple of nice instrumentals, mix in a traditional song or two and add a few tracks addressing social concerns. But Masekela’s flugelhorn talent is so vast that it’s a shame that he can’t figure out a way to offer a CD that connects with his jazz roots, a la Chris Botti's When I Fall in Love."

Jim Santella of All About Jazz wrote: "Throughout much of the album, however, the trumpeter's tone and emphasis remain weak. His vocalist guests take center stage, as Masekela weaves in cornet and flugelhorn melodies behind them. The full force of his flugelhorn tone remains hidden and a bit off the mark. This revival of South African music does not revive his tone and technique. Nor does his singing add anything musical to the tour. Nevertheless, Masekela's heartstrings are showing, and you can't help but love the warmth that he endows on his country's cultural change."

Track listing

Personnel
Hugh Masekela – vocals, flugelhorn, keyboards
Malaika – vocals
Zwai Bala – vocals
Corlea – vocals 
Jimmy Dludlu – guitar
John Selolwane – guitar
Themba Mokeona – guitar
Lawrence Matshiza – guitar
Khaya Mahlangu – flute, tenor saxophone
Moses Khumalo – alto saxophone 
Godfrey Pilane – keyboards
Ezbie Moilwa - Keyboards
Ngoako Manamela – vibraphone 
Lucas Senyatso – bass guitar
Sello Montwedi – drums
Francis Fuster – percussion

References

External links

2005 albums
Hugh Masekela albums